The 2017–18 OGC Nice season was the 113th professional season of the club since its creation in 1904.

Players

Squad information
Players and squad numbers last updated on 1 September 2017.Note: Flags indicate national team as has been defined under FIFA eligibility rules. Players may hold more than one non-FIFA nationality.

Transfers

Out

Pre-season and friendlies

Competitions

Overall

Ligue 1

League table

Results summary

Results by round

Matches

Coupe de France

Coupe de la Ligue

UEFA Champions League

Third qualifying round

Play-off round

UEFA Europa League

Group stage

Knockout phase

Round of 32

References

OGC Nice seasons
Nice